Richard Allen Correll (born 1964)  is a United States Navy vice admiral who serves as the deputy commander of the United States Strategic Command. He previously served as the director of strategic integration of the United States Navy from July 17, 2020, to July 15, 2022.

Correll graduated from the Rose–Hulman Institute of Technology in 1986 with a B.S. degree in chemical engineering. He later earned a master's degree in international strategic studies from The Fletcher School of Law and Diplomacy at Tufts University.

In May 2022, Correll was nominated for promotion to vice admiral and assignment as the deputy commander of United States Strategic Command.

References

External links
 

Date of birth missing (living people)
1964 births
Living people
Place of birth missing (living people)
Rose–Hulman Institute of Technology alumni
The Fletcher School at Tufts University alumni
United States submarine commanders
Recipients of the Meritorious Service Medal (United States)
Recipients of the Legion of Merit
United States Navy admirals
Recipients of the Defense Superior Service Medal